Xbase-Clients is a suite of tools and utilities for the X Window System.

Included tools 
editres, which queries and updates the X resource database
startx and xinit, which initialize X sessions from the command line
xauth, a tool for controlling access to the X session
xbiff, a tool which tells you when you have new email
xcalc, a scientific calculator desktop accessory
xclipboard, a tool to manage cut-and-pasted text selections
xcutsel, which exchanges selection and cut buffer contents
xedit, a text editor
xev, an X event displayer
xhost, a tool to add or remove access to the X server for specified hosts
xman, a manual page browser
Xmark, tool for benchmarking graphical operations
xrandr, a command-line interface to the RandR extension
xsm, a session manager for X sessions
xwd and xwud, utilities for taking and viewing window dumps ("screenshots") of the X session

Demos 
xeyes, in which a pair of eyes track the pointer

See also 
xterm

External links
XBaseClients

X Window programs